Vexillum coccineum is a species of small sea snail, marine gastropod mollusk in the family Costellariidae, the ribbed miters.

Description
The length of the shell varies between 58 mm and 76 mm.

(Original description) The shell is elongately fusiform. The spire is acuminated. The whorls are longitudinally obtusely ribbed, interstices transversely elevately striated. The ribs of the last whorls are somewhat indistinct. The shell is bright scarlet encircled by a simple white belt. The columella is four-plaited.

Distribution
This marine species occurs off the Philippines, Indonesia, Taiwan, Japan; in the South China Sea

References

External links
 

coccineum
Gastropods described in 1844